Berthou is a surname, and may refer to;

 Gwilherm Berthou (1908–1951) – Breton nationalist terrorist and neo-Druidic bardic poet.
 Erwan Berthou (1861–1933) – French and Breton language poet, writer and neo-Druid ic bard.
 Éric Berthou (born 1980) – French professional road bicycle racer.
 Jacques Berthou (born 1940) – member of the Senate of France

Breton-language surnames
Surnames of Breton origin